Tuktayevo (Tuqtay) is a rural locality (a village) in Starobaltachevsky Selsoviet, Baltachevsky District, Bashkortostan, Russia. The population was 115 as of 2010. There are 5 streets.

Geography 
Tuktayevo is located 10 km northeast of Starobaltachevo (the district's administrative centre) by road. Novobaltachevo is the nearest rural locality.

References 

Rural localities in Baltachevsky District